Arab Zehi (also Romanized as ‘Arab Zehī; also known as ‘Arab Zā’ī and ‘Arabzī) is a village in Polan Rural District, Polan District, Chabahar County, Sistan and Baluchestan Province, Iran. At the 2006 census, its population was 121, in 19 families.

References 

Populated places in Chabahar County